Owen Phillips (birth unknown) is a Welsh former professional rugby league footballer who played in the 1950s.

International honours
Owen Phillips represented Combined Nationalities in the 15-19 defeat by France at Stade de Gerland, Lyon on Sunday 3 January 1954, and won caps for Wales while at Swinton in 1951 against  England, Other Nationalities, and New Zealand, in 1952 against France (2 matches), and in 1953 against England.

References

Living people
Combined Nationalities rugby league team players
Rugby league players from Swansea
Rugby league props
Swinton Lions players
Wales national rugby league team players
Welsh rugby league players
Year of birth missing (living people)